The Goodman Hills are a group of coastal hills in Antarctica, of about  extent, rising directly south of Cape Kinsey and between Paternostro Glacier and Tomilin Glacier. They were mapped by the United States Geological Survey from surveys and U.S. Navy aerial photography, 1960–63, and were named for Commander Kelsey B. Goodman, U.S. Navy, Plans Officer on the staff of the Commander, Naval Support Force Antarctica, 1969–72; Assistant for Polar Regions in the Office of the Secretary of Defense, 1972–74; Member of the Advisory Committee on Antarctic Names, U.S. Board on Geographic Names, 1973–76.

References

Hills of Oates Land